The Cascadia movement is a bioregional movement based in the Cascadia bioregion of western North America. Potential boundaries differ, with some drawn along existing political state and provincial lines, and others drawn along larger ecological, cultural, political, and economic boundaries.

The proposed country or region largely would consist of the Canadian province of British Columbia and the US States of Washington and Oregon, including major cities Seattle,  Vancouver, and Portland. When all parts of the bioregion are included, Cascadia would stretch from coastal Alaska in the north into Northern California in the south, and inland to include parts of Idaho, Montana, Nevada, Utah, Wyoming, and Yukon. More conservative advocates propose borders that include the land west of the crest of Cascade Range, and the western side of British Columbia.

As measured only by the combination of present Washington, Oregon, and British Columbia statistics, Cascadia would be home to slightly more than 16 million people (16,029,520), and would have an economy generating more than US$675 billion worth of goods and services annually.  This number would increase if portions of Northern California, Idaho, and Southern Alaska were also included.
By land area Cascadia would be the 20th largest country in the world, with a land area of 534,572 sq mi (1,384,588 km2), placing it behind Mongolia and ahead of Peru. Its population would be similar in size to that of Ecuador, Zambia, Cambodia or the Netherlands.

Description of the movement
The Cascadia movement contains groups and organizations with a wide range of goals and strategies. Some groups, such as the Cascadian Bioregional Party, focus on the independence of the Cascadian bioregion while others, such as the Cascadia Department of Bioregion, a 501(c)3 non-profit, seek to build a bioregionalist network as an alternative to the nation-state structure.

There are several reasons why the Cascadia movement aims to foster connections and a sense of place within the Pacific Northwest region and strive toward independence. The main reasons stated by the movement include environmentalism, bioregionalism, privacy, civil liberties and freedom, increased regional integration, and local food networks and economies.

The designer of the Doug flag, Alexander Baretich, claims that Cascadia is not necessarily about secession but is rather about survival after the collapse of peak oil, global warming, and other pending environmental and socioeconomic problems.

Colonial background
Before 1800, it is estimated that more than 500,000 people lived within the region in dozens of Coast Salish nations, like the Chinook, Haida, Nootka, Tlingit and more. They lived and traded largely within the Cascadia Bioregion along watershed boundaries, and used the extensive system of waterways as chief systems for navigation of pre-colonial trade. They spoke many different languages.

Indigenous sovereignty, the rights of nature, and decolonization remain a key point for many Cascadian and first nation organizers, who argue that indigenous self-determination cannot be gained legally under the framework of the United States constitution.

19th century

Oregon Country and Columbia District

An 1813 letter from Thomas Jefferson to John Jacob Astor congratulated Astor on the establishment of Fort Astoria (the coastal fur trade post of Astor's Pacific Fur Company) and described Fort Astoria as "the germ of a great, free, and independent empire on that side of our continent, and that liberty and self-government spreading from that as well as from this side, will insure their complete establishment over the whole." He went on to criticize the British, who were also establishing fur trade networks in the region: "It would be an afflicting thing, indeed, should the English be able to break up the settlement. Their bigotry to the bastard liberty of their own country, and habitual hostility to every degree of freedom in any other, will induce the attempt." The same year of Jefferson's letter, Fort Astoria was sold to the British North West Company, based in Montreal.

John Quincy Adams agreed with Jefferson's views about Fort Astoria, and labeled the entire Northwest as "the empire of Astoria", although he also saw the whole continent as "destined by Divine Providence to be peopled by one nation." As late as the 1820s James Monroe and Thomas Hart Benton thought the region west of the Rockies would be an independent nation.

Elements among the region's colonist population starting in the 1840s sought to form their own country, despite their small number. Oregon pioneer John McLoughlin was employed as the Chief Factor (regional administrator) by the Hudson's Bay Company for the Columbia District, administered from Fort Vancouver. McLoughlin was a significant force in the early history of the Oregon Country, and argued for its independence. In 1842 McLoughlin (through his lawyer) advocated an independent nation that would be free of the United States during debates at the Oregon Lyceum. This view won support at first and a resolution was adopted. When the first settlers of the Willamette Valley held a series of politically foundational meetings in 1843, called the Wolf Meetings, a majority voted to establish an independent republic. Action was postponed by George Abernethy of the Methodist Mission to wait on forming an independent country.

In May 1843, the settlers in the Oregon Country created their first western-style government as a Provisional Government. Several months later the Organic Laws of Oregon were drawn up to create a legislature, an executive committee, a judicial system, and a system of subscriptions to defray expenses. Members of the ultra-American party insisted that the final lines of the Organic Act would be "until such time as the USA extend their jurisdiction over us" to try to end the Oregon Territorial independence movement. George Abernethy was elected its first and only Provisional Governor, with an opposing faction led by Osborne Russell favoring independence. Russell proposed that the Oregon Territory not join the United States, but instead become a Pacific Republic that stretched from the Pacific Ocean to the Continental Divide.

British claims north of the Columbia River were ceded to the United States by the contentious Oregon Treaty of 1846. In 1860, there were three different statements from separate influential individuals on the creation of a "Pacific Republic".

American Civil War
When the Southern states of the U.S. seceded to form the Confederate States of America, some Oregon Territory settlers reacted to the instability of the union as another opportunity to seek independence. The leader of California's federal forces at the outset of the Civil War was himself a supporter of the Confederate cause, but that movement proved weaker than its opposition. For his role in convincing Californians to remain in the Union, Thomas Starr King was honored as one of the two "heroes of California" in the U.S. Capitol's National Statuary Hall Collection until 2009, when his statue was replaced by one of Ronald Reagan.

While independence movements during this time failed to take root, Adella M. Parker, president of the University of Washington Alumni Association, argued in her speech at the groundbreaking of the Seattle campus that the Pacific Northwest should build a new regional culture:

20th century

State of Jefferson

After attempts in the mid-19th century at forming a State of Jefferson prior to becoming Oregon and then again in the 1930s, citizens attempted the best known of such movements in the region. During 1940 and 1941, organizers attracted media attention by arming themselves and blockading Highway 99 to the south of Yreka, California, where they collected tolls from motorists and passed out proclamations of independence. When a California Highway Patrolman turned up on the scene, he was told to "get down the road back to California". The movement was created to draw attention to the area by proposing that Southern Oregon and Northern California secede from their respective state governments to form a separate state within the United States. A perceived lack of attention and resources from their state governments led to the adoption of a flag design bearing a gold pan and two X's, a "double cross." The movement quickly ended, however, after the Japanese attack on Pearl Harbor on December 7, 1941. Stanton Delaplane's coverage of the State of Jefferson won the 1942 Pulitzer Prize for Reporting.

In 1956, groups from Cave Junction, Oregon and Dunsmuir, California threatened to tear Southern Oregon and Northern California from their respective state rulers to form the State of Jefferson.

Ecotopia 

Ernest Callenbach's environmental Utopian novel Ecotopia (1975) follows an American reporter, William Weston, on his tour through a secretive republic (the former Washington, Oregon, and northern California) 20 years after their secession from the U.S.  At first wary and uncomfortable, Weston is shown a society that has been centrally planned, scaled down, and readapted to fit within the constraints of environmental sustainability.

Cascadia and bioregionalism 

Cascadia is an idea rooted in bioregionalism. Cascadians believe that the Cascadia bioregion is a better representation of place, and the people and inhabitants living there, than the current United States or Canadian borders or state lines, which they feel arbitrarily divides the geography and communities living within it.

Bioregional congresses 
The early Cascadia movement was formed through a series of Cascadia "Bioregional Congresses" held in the early 1980s. They were a regional extension of the North American Bioregional Congresses (NABC), and were designed to alternate in tandem with continental and regionally focused meetings about social needs and governance. The first Cascadia Bioregional Congress was held in 1986 at The Evergreen State College in Olympia, Washington, followed by the Ish River Bioregional Confluence in 1987, and a Pacific Cascadia Bioregional Congress held in 1988. Each of these gatherings brought together about a hundred people as "delegates" for their watersheds.

Cascadia bioregion 

The Cascadia bioregion is defined by the watersheds of the Fraser, Snake and Columbia River, and encompasses all or portions of Washington, Oregon, Idaho, California, Nevada, Wyoming, Montana, Alaska, British Columbia, and Alberta. It stretches from Cape Mendocino in the south, to Mt. St. Alias in the North, and as far east as the Yellowstone Caldera.

The delineation of a bioregion is defined through watersheds and ecoregions, with the belief that political boundaries should match ecological and cultural boundaries, and that culture stems from place. Current Cascadian bioregionalists use this framework as an argument for independence, autonomy and what they feel better represents the communities and area as an alternative to capitalism and the nation state.

Cascadian Bioregional Flag 

The Cascadian Bioregional Flag, also known as the Doug Flag, or simply the Cascadia Flag, is a commonly accepted symbol for the Cascadia movement. It was designed in 1994 by Portland native Alexander Baretich. It is intended to be a direct representation of the bioregion, with green for the forests, blue for the waters, and white for the snow-capped mountains, with a Douglas Fir tree to symbolize the resilience of the region. Writing about the flag's symbolism Baretich said:

Regional identity
The idea of Cascadia as an economic cross-border region has been embraced by a wide diversity of civic leaders and organizations. The "Main Street Cascadia" transportation corridor concept was formed by former mayor of Seattle Paul Schell during 1991 and 1992. Schell later defended his cross-border efforts during the 1999 American Planning Association convention, saying "that Cascadia represents better than states, countries and cities the cultural and geographical realities of the corridor from Eugene to Vancouver, B.C." Schell also formed the Cascadia Mayors Council, bringing together mayors from cities along the corridor from Whistler, British Columbia, to Medford, Oregon. The last meeting was held in May 2004. Other cross-border groups were set up in the 1990s, such as the Cascadia Economic Council and the Cascadia Corridor Commission.

The region is served by several cooperative organizations and interstate or international agencies, especially since 2008 with the signing of the Pacific Coast Collaborative which places new emphasis on bio-regionally coordinated policies on the environmental, forestry and fishery management, emergency preparedness and critical infrastructure, regional high-speed rail and road transportation as well as tourism.

The area from Vancouver, B.C. down to Portland has been termed an emerging megaregion by the National Committee for America 2050, a coalition of regional planners, scholars, and policy-makers. This group defines a megaregion as an area where "boundaries [between metropolitan regions] begin to blur, creating a new scale of geography".  These areas have interlocking economic systems, shared natural resources and ecosystems, and common transportation systems link these population centers together. This area contains 17% of Cascadian land mass, but more than 80% of the Cascadian population. Programs such as the enhanced driver's license program can be used to more easily cross the border between Washington and British Columbia.

Secessionist activism

Cascadian secessionist movements generally state that their political motivations deal mostly with political, economic, cultural, and ecological ties, as well as the beliefs that the eastern federal governments are out of touch, slow to respond, and hinder provincial and state attempts at further bioregional integration. These connections go back to the Oregon Territory, and further back to the Oregon Country, the land most commonly associated with Cascadia, and the last time the region was treated as a single political unit, though administered by two countries. Some have asserted that political protest in the wake of the 2004 United States presidential election appears to be the primary reason for renewed separatist movements throughout states with substantial Democratic majorities, such as Washington and Oregon.

Cascadian independence has seen a resurgence in popularity following the election of Donald Trump as president of the United States on November 8, 2016, with a secession referendum proposed in Oregon. The individuals who put forward the proposal have since withdrawn their petition. Several new Cascadia organizations have also formed in that time period. Immediately after Trump's election, a series of Yes Cascadia meetings were formed to explore the idea of a Cascadia Secession Movement gathering hundreds of people in person, later changing their name to Vote Cascadia.

Members of the Cascadian independence movement have declared May 18 as "Cascadia Day", in recognition of the lateral eruption of Mount St. Helens in 1980, with the week surrounding that date being "Cascadia Culture Week".

The Cascadia Party of British Columbia formed in 2016 and nominated two candidates, though neither were elected, in the 2017 British Columbia general election to advocate for sovereignty for the Cascadia bioregion. It did not run any candidates in the 2020 British Columbia general election.

In May 2021, the Cascadia Bioregional Party was established, advocating the independence of the Cascadian Bioregion from the United States and Canada, and several social, environmental and economic reforms.

Public support for secession

Canada
In British Columbia, a 2020 poll by Glacier Media and Research Co. has shown a significant growth of support for Cascadia and British Columbia as a standalone independent country. As a standalone country, support has gone up to 27% from 17% in 2018 and 2019, British Columbians aged 18 to 34 are more likely to feel that the province could be independent (37% growth in support) than those aged 35 to 54 (28% growth in support) and those aged 55 and over (18% growth in support).  Support for the idea Cascadia specifically, of joining with Washington and Oregon in some fashion held quite a positive view, especially among younger generations, with those in support aged 18 to 34 at 66%, 60% of those aged 35 to 54 and 48% of those aged 55 and over. Support for the “Wexit” movement in Alberta remains low at 15%.

A poll commissioned by the Western Standard magazine in 2005 asked whether "western Canadians should begin to explore the idea of forming their own country", and 35.6% of respondents from Western Canada agreed.

Angus Reid conducted a four part study on Western Canadian identity and surveyed 4,024 Canadians in late December and early January 2017 and 2018. It showed that 54 percent of British Columbians felt they had the most in common with Washington state, 18 percent picked California while just 15 per cent chose Alberta, 9% percent chose Ontario, and less than 3% chose Manitoba, Saskatchewan or another Canadian area.  This connection, while not new, has steadily continued to grow (In 1991, fully half of B.C. respondents told the Angus Reid Group they had the most in common with Washington) and more telling, in 1991 there was a much greater degree of mutual recognition between British Columbia and Alberta, and other parts of Canada.

United States

While it is difficult to gauge support for Cascadia specifically in Washington and Oregon, because no research has been done for those states, support for the idea of secession is at one of its highest points in the history of the United States. In 2021, a study was conducted by Brightline Watch of 2,750 Americans between June 16 and June 26 that asked "Would you support or oppose (your state) seceding from the United States to join a new union (list of five regional unions)?". The poll found that support for the idea of regional secession was highest in the Pacific and Southern regions, with 66% of Republicans, 50% of independents in the South, and 47% of Democrats in the Pacific supporting the idea of secession. In this survey, Brightline used the regional union of Washington, Oregon, Alaska, Hawaii and California as the Pacific regional union. Overall, support for the idea of secession was 37% in the US in general. In a 2022 poll, the Center for Politics at University of Virginia ran a poll that found similar results, finding that "52% of Trump voters and 41% of Biden voters “at least somewhat agree that it’s time to split the country, favoring blue/red states seceding from the union”.

This builds on earlier work by Zogby International, which in 2018 conducted a national poll that found that 39% of Americans support the idea of independence, with 68% of people being open to a state's or region's right to peacefully secede from the United States, the highest rate since the American Civil War. This number included 41% of Democrats, with the largest demographic supporting the idea being Black Americans at 47%, replacing the previous current highest block (which had been Latinos 51% in 2017), and followed by Republicans at 39%.

However, none of these studies are specifically about forming an independent Cascadia. The movement saw much discussion in the 1990s, and while the increase in security and American nationalism after the September 11 attacks set back the movement's momentum for some time, the concept has continued to become more ingrained into society and the public consciousness. In January 2011, Time magazine included Cascadia number eight on a list of "Top 10 Aspiring Nations", noting it "has little chance of ever becoming a reality".

In popular culture

 The Doug flag showing a Douglas fir tree appears to be the most commonly adopted flag of the Cascadian movement. Designed in the academic year of 1994–1995 by Portland, Oregon native and Cascadian bioregional awareness activist Alexander Baretich, its blue represents sky and the Pacific Ocean, the white represents clouds and snow, and the green represents the forest.  As of 2010, the "Doug" has also been adopted by the Portland Timbers supporters group Timbers Army, sometimes of giant size, although the flag is also raised by Seattle and Vancouver supporters, as well. The three teams compete in the supporter-sponsored Cascadia Cup. In 2010, Hopworks Urban Brewery in Portland introduced Secession Black IPA with the Doug flag as part of its label.
 The documentary Occupied Cascadia is focused on bioregionalism and environmentalism, and explores concepts of decolonization, and the growth of the Cascadia independence movement.
The 2005 North American Science Fiction Convention (or NASFiC), Cascadia Con, presented itself as a Cascadian convention, using material from the Republic of Cascadia website, and other sources.
In 2010, Lloyd Vivola, an artist, bioregion supporter and environmental activist, wrote and recorded a song called "O Cascadia – A Folk Anthem for the Pacific Northwest".
In 2013, the Cascadia Association Football Federation (CAFF) was founded and admitted to the N.F.-Board at their annual general meeting in Munich. Later that year they joined ConIFA.
The 2016 book Towards Cascadia explores the societal identity of the Pacific Northwest, the concepts of bioregionalism and freedom, pressing civic issues, and the possibility of Cascadian independence achieved both peacefully and constitutionally.
In 2017, the Cascadia Association Football Federation qualified for ConIFA's 2018 World Football Cup. In 2018, they sent a soccer team to the 2018 ConIFA World Football Cup in London captained by former Seattle Sounders FC defender James Riley. This would mark the first time a team from North America played in a ConIFA competition.
In 2018, an orchestral version of Lloyd Vivola's song "O Cascadia" was adopted by the Cascadia National Team. On June 2, 2018, it along with the Barawan anthem was played prior to the kickoff of their match vs Barawa at Carshalton Athletic FC's War Memorial Sports Ground in Sutton. They earned sixth place.
In 2019, the Vancouver-based band Said the Whale released an album called "Cascadia".
The 2020 video game Project Wingman depicts a war loosely based on the concept of Cascadian independence that takes place in a post-apocalyptic Earth with drastically altered geography and geopolitics. United Cascadia, which includes Alaska and parts of the North American West Coast which have become an island, is shown seceding from a superpower, albeit one (the Pacific Federation) comprising the Pacific Rim rather than the continent alone.

See also 

Secession in the United States
Secession in Canada
California Republic, 1846 (California independence movement)
Cascadia (bioregion)
Cascadia Cup, a trophy which is awarded each season to the best Major League Soccer team in the Pacific Northwest
Laurentia (bioregion), another bioregional and cultural region shared by the United States and Canada
Lincoln (proposed Northwestern state)
North American integration
Oregon boundary dispute
Thermal Refugia*
Biosink*

References

Further reading
Todd, Douglas. "Cascadians: Shared Cultural Traits, Values." The Vancouver Sun. May 7, 2008.
Abraham, Kera. "A Free Cascadia." Eugene Weekly. September 9, 2006.
Fleming, Thomas. "America's Crackup." National Review, June 28, 1997, Vol. 49, Issue 14
  Alt URL
Henkel, William B. "Cascadia: A state of (various) mind(s)." Chicago Review, 1993, Vol. 39, Issue 3/4
Jannsson, David. Divided we Stand, United We Fall (2006) – CounterPunch, December 20, 2006
Ketcham, Christopher. "Most Likely to Secede – Interviews with a few prominent figures who actively promote self governance." Good Magazine, January 2008.
Moothart, Ryan C. Towards Cascadia. Minneapolis, MN: Mill City Press. .
Nussbaum, Paul. "Coming together to Ponder Pulling Apart." The Philadelphia Inquirer, November 2006.
Overby, Peter. "We're outta here." Common Cause Magazine, Win92, Vol. 18, Issue 4
Crane, David, Paul Fraser, and James D. Phillips. "Western Regionalism: Views on Cascadia." Canada-United States Law Journal, 2004, Vol. 30, p321-347, 22p
Powell, Mark W. "The Americas: British Columbia's future may not lie with 'Old Canada'." The Wall Street Journal. June 9, 1995. pg. A11

Will, Gudrun. "Cascadia Rising." Vancouver Review, 2006.
Woodward, Steve. "Welcome to Cascadia" The Oregonian, November 14, 2004.
"Welcome to Cascadia." The Economist, 5/21/94, Vol. 331, Issue 7864

External links

Freecascadia.org, the website belonging to Alexander Baretich, designer of the Cascadian flag, and advocate of Bioregionalism.
Cascadia Department of Bioregion - primary website of the Cascadia movement, with extensive sections about bioregionalism, the movement, and how to be involved. 
Cascadia Bioregional Party - political organization dedicated to advancing Cascadian principles and bioregionalism

Canada–United States relations
Colonialism
Culture of the Pacific Northwest
Geographical neologisms
Independence movements
History of the Pacific Northwest
Proposed countries
Separatism in Canada
Separatism in the United States
Culture of Western Canada
Politics of Western Canada
Geography of Western Canada